The Archie Webster House is a historic house located in Jerome, Idaho.

Description and history
The lava rock home was built by mason Ed Bennett. It was completed in 1924 and reflects the American Craftsman architectural style. The  building has a gable roof which overhangs a full inset porch on the east exposure. It was listed on the National Register of Historic Places on September 8, 1983, as part of a group of structures built from lava rock in south central Idaho.

See also
 Historic preservation
 National Register of Historic Places listings in Jerome County, Idaho

References

External links
 
 

1924 establishments in Idaho
Bungalow architecture in Idaho
Houses completed in 1924
Houses in Jerome County, Idaho
Houses on the National Register of Historic Places in Idaho
National Register of Historic Places in Jerome County, Idaho